Most of the members of the Capetian dynasty bore a version of the arms of France. The arms of France were adopted by the Capetian kings only in the twelfth century. Consequently, the cadet branches that had branched off in earlier periods (Burgundy, Vermandois, Dreux and Courtenay) bore entirely different arms.

Today, many coat of arms of places in France are derived from the royal arms of the French king.

French royal family

Crowns of the princes of the blood

Basic Marks of Difference

France Ancient
The most basic marks of difference used by the Capetians were the label, bordure and bend. Charges and variations were added by cadets with the expansion of the dynasty. The cross and saltire were used as marks of distinction by the spiritual peers of France.

France Modern
Under the House of Bourbon the bend gules gradually evolved into a baton couped, while the label argent and bordure gules were associated with the dukes of Orleans and Anjou, respectively.

Cadet Branches of the direct Capetians

House of Valois

Valois House of Orléans

Valois House of Anjou

Valois House of Burgundy

Illegitimate descendants of Philip the Good

House of Valois-Alençon

House of Évreux

House of Bourbon

House of Bourbon-La Marche 

House of Bourbon-Vendôme

Royal House of Bourbon

Spanish House of Bourbon

House of Bourbon-Two Sicilies

House of Bourbon-Parma 

House of Bourbon-Parma-Luxembourg

Bourbon House of Orléans

House of Orléans-Braganza

House of Bourbon-Condé

House of Bourbon-Carency

House of Bourbon-Préaux

Illegitimate branches

House of Bourbon-Lavedan

House of Bourbon-Busset

House of Bourbon-Roussillon

House of Artois

House of Anjou-Sicily

House of Dreux

House of Dreux-Beu

House of Dreux-Brittany

House of Dreux-Brittany-Machecoul

Avaugour branch, Counts of Goëllo

House of Courtenay

House of Vermandois

House of Burgundy

House of Burgundy-Portugal

References

Bibliography

French translation of 

French translation of 

Coats of arms
Capetian dynasty
Capetian